Henry Gwyn Saunders Davies (2 February 1865 – 4 December 1934) was a Welsh horse racing jockey and first-class cricketer.

Biography 

The son of Arthur Henry Saunders Davies, he was born in Pembroke in January 1865. He was educated in England at Winchester College, where he played for his college cricket team. In 1882, Davies had his first competitive ride as a jockey in the Lawrenny Hunt Cup, while the following year he rode his first winner, Jane Shore, in the Tivyside Hunt steeplechase meeting.

Davies represented Hampshire in a single first-class match in 1883 against Sussex, where he scored 42 in Hampshire's first innings and a 3 in their second innings.

In March 1921, Henry changed his name to Henry Gwyn Davies-Scourfield.

Davies died in Patching, Sussex on 4 December 1934.

References

External links
Henry Davies at Cricinfo
Henry Davies at CricketArchive

1865 births
1934 deaths
Cricketers from Pembroke, Pembrokeshire
People educated at Winchester College
Welsh cricketers
Hampshire cricketers
Welsh jockeys